State Route 165 (SR 165) is a rural north–south state highway in the U.S. state of California. It runs in the San Joaquin Valley from Interstate 5 south of Los Banos to State Route 99 in Turlock.

Route description

State Route 165 begins at the junction of Interstate 5 south of Los Banos and heads north on a rural two-lane highway known as Mercey Springs Road. The highway crosses the California Aqueduct north of Interstate 5 and enters Los Banos several miles later. It meets up with SR 152 and SR 33, known locally as Pacheco Boulevard. After leaving Los Banos, the highway then runs right through the San Luis National Wildlife Refuge and skirts the Great Valley Grasslands State Park to the west while crossing the San Joaquin River. At this point, the highway is known as Lander Avenue and meets up with SR 140 near Stevinson. It crosses the Merced River en route to Hilmar, then crosses into Stanislaus County for a short while, ending at SR 99 in Turlock.

SR 165 in Los Banos is part of the National Highway System, a network of highways that are considered essential to the country's economy, defense, and mobility by the Federal Highway Administration.

Major intersections

See also

References

External links

California @ AARoads.com - State Route 165
Caltrans: Route 165 highway conditions
California Highways: SR 165

165
State Route 165
State Route 165
Turlock, California